CBC North is the Canadian Broadcasting Corporation's radio and television service in Northern Canada.

History 
CBC North began its operations in 1958 as the CBC Northern Service when it took over CFYK, a community-run radio station in Yellowknife, Northwest Territories, which had been broadcasting since 1948.

Shortwave broadcasting to the North began in 1960 from CBC's shortwave transmitter complex in Sackville, New Brunswick. CFFB began operation in Frobisher Bay (now Iqaluit) on February 6, 1961. The service consisted of local programming in Inuktitut, English and French, as well as news and other programs from the CBC network received via shortwave.

With the advent of the Anik series of satellites, Inuktitut and English radio programming from CFFB became accessible in most Eastern Arctic communities in late 1971.

Radio 
CBC North Radio carries daily Indigenous language programming in Dene Suline, Tlicho, North and South Slavey, Gwich'in, Inuvialuktun, Inuktitut, and Cree. The shows include news, weather, and entertainment, providing service to the many indigenous people in Northern Canada whose first language is not English.

Yukon
In the Yukon, the regular CBC Radio One schedule in English airs on CFWH. CFWH is the only station in the network which uses the Saturday afternoon 5:00 to 6:00 p.m. local arts program block to air a French-language program, Rencontres, as the territory outside Whitehorse is not served by an Ici Radio-Canada Première production centre or a local francophone community radio station. Whitehorse is served locally by CFWY-FM 102.1, a repeater of CBUF-FM Vancouver which is owned locally by the Association Franco-Yukonnaise.

Northwest Territories
In the Northwest Territories, there are two main stations, one in Yellowknife in the Southeast and one in Inuvik in the Northwest.

Yellowknife
Languages served by CFYK-FM Yellowknife besides English are Dogrib (Tide Godi, "Great Lake news"), South Slavey (Dehcho Dene, "Big River people"), and Chipewyan (Denesuline Yatia).

Inuvik
First Nations' languages on CHAK Inuvik are Gwich'in (Nantaii, "country road"), North Slavey (Le Got'she Deh, "locality and land"), and Inuvialuktun (Tusaavik, "listening place").

Nunavut
The Nunavut service with its main station CFFB in Iqaluit is the only local or regional CBC Radio service which covers three time zones (Eastern, Central, and Mountain). Bilingual programs in Inuktitut and English are Qulliq ("oil lamp") in the morning and Nipivut ("our voices") middays. Afternoon programmes comprise Tausunni ("smell of humans") from Iqaluit, Tuttavik ("place of encounter") from Kuujjuaq, Nunavik (CFFB-FM-5) and Tusaajaksat ("things heard about") from Rankin Inlet, Kivalliq Region (CBQR-FM). Evening shows include Ullumi Tusaqsauqaujut ("heard today") and Sinnaksautit ("bedtimes"). Furthermore, there is a Sunday Request Show.

Nord-du-Québec

Nunavik
In the Nunavik region of Northern Quebec, CBC North is heard on a single-frequency network of low-power FM transmitters (main station: CFFB-FM-5 Kuujjuaq, 103.5 FM, 50 watts), combining programmes from Iqaluit (CFFB) and Quebec City (CBVE-FM). These FM transmitters replaced the Northern Quebec Shortwave Service in 2012 (see below).

Eeyou Istchee
In Eeyou Istchee, CBMP-FM Chisasibi (105.1 FM, 105 watts) and its repeaters carry the East Cree language programmes Winschgaoug ("get up") and Eyou Dipajimoon ("Cree news") from Montreal. Until July 2020 they had been broadcast on the French outlet CBFG-FM. They are supplemented by English language shows from Montreal and Quebec City. Former programmes include Âshûmîyi ("pass it on") and the French Soirée Boréale.

Shortwave service 
CBC Radio Nord Québec used to operate a shortwave service, transmitted from the Radio Canada International transmitter (CKCX) in Sackville, New Brunswick, on 9.625 MHz with 100 kW and programmed from the CBC studios in Montreal. This shortwave service was shut down December 1, 2012 and replaced by five low-powered FM transmitters broadcasting on 103.5 MHz from Puvirnituq, Kuujjuarapik, Inukjuak, Salluit, and Kuujjuaq (CFFB-FM-5).

Two CBC Radio One stations, CFGB-FM in Happy Valley-Goose Bay, Newfoundland and Labrador (with call sign CKZN) and CBU in Vancouver, British Columbia (with call sign CKZU) operate shortwave relay transmitters, but neither transmitter site has the ability to reach the Arctic with usable signals year-round.

Reception issues 
Both Radio One transmitters broadcast 1 kW Effective radiated power. These shortwave relays can be difficult to receive due to increased terrestrial noise from electrical and electronic systems. As well, nighttime broadcasting on 9.625 MHz is difficult due to interference from Radio Exterior de España, which uses that frequency at night for transmission to North America.

Northern Messenger
Until the 1970s, CBC Northern Service featured a mailbag program on Friday or Saturday evenings entitled The Northern Messenger. Letters were sent to the CBC studios in Montreal and read on the air to listeners in far-flung settlements. The Northern Messenger functioned in an era before long-distance telephone networks had reached the region as a way to provide residents in remote locations with a means to communicate with friends and family in the south, as normal mail delivery was infrequent or non-existent, especially during the winter months.

The original Northern Messenger was produced by KDKA and broadcast on its shortwave radio simulcaster, 8XS (later known as W8XK and WPIT). Its intended audience were Royal Canadian Mounted Police officers and other southerners stationed in the Canadian Arctic, to keep them in touch with events in the outside world. KDKA was owned and operated by Westinghouse Electric Corporation and the suggestion for Northern Messenger came from Canadian Westinghouse. The show consisted of messages from listeners to their friends and family living in the Far North, recorded music, and news, and would broadcast weekly from November to May, when normal mail delivery was unavailable. KDKA's Northern Messenger and "Far Northern Service" operated from 1923 until 1940; in later years the Canadian-produced version was carried.

In 1932, the Canadian Radio Broadcasting Commission began its own version of the service, initially under the name Canadian Northern Messenger, on its network of mediumwave and shortwave stations. The show was initially broadcast Saturday nights, and like its American cousin, consisted of personal messages from friends and family around the world to RCMP officers, missionaries, trappers, doctors, nurses, and scientists as well as Cree and Inuit, and also ran from November to May. It was initially produced by CRCT in Toronto and carried on the CRBC's network including shortwave stations CRCX (Bowmanville), CJRO/CJRX (Winnipeg), and VE9DN (Drummondville, Quebec) - the shortwave stations would continue to broadcast the programme throughout the 1930s. When the Canadian Broadcasting Corporation was formed as the successor to the CRBC, the programme was continued by CBC Radio into the 1970s. During its first year, Canadian Northern Messenger relayed 1,754 messages, and would handle six times that many by its fourth year.

CBC produced the program out of CBO in Ottawa in the 1930s, then from its Winnipeg studio in the 1950s and early 1960s, and finally from its Montreal studios beginning in 1965. Beginning in the 1940s, it would be recorded and broadcast over western CBC stations CBW Winnipeg, CBX Edmonton, and CBK in Saskatchewan and the Northwest Territories and Yukon Radio System on Friday nights, with broadcasts reaching Yukon and Northwest Territories, and then rebroadcast eight days later over CBC's powerful Sackville Relay Station aimed at Labrador, northern Quebec, and the eastern Arctic.

Television

The primary CBC North television production centre is CFYK-DT in Yellowknife, with local news bureaus located in Hay River, Inuvik, Whitehorse and Iqaluit. The CBC North television service is seen through a network of community-owned rebroadcasters in some communities in the Northwest Territories, the Yukon, and Nunavut. Until July 31, 2012, the CBC owned and operated many rebroadcasters in the Canadian Arctic which, combined with community rebroadcasters, ensured coverage to the vast majority of communities in the North. These rebroadcasters shut down on that date because of budget cuts mandated by the CBC; only the transmitters owned by local governments or community organizations remain in operation. Among the rebroadcasters affected by the closure were CFWH-TV in Whitehorse and CFFB-TV in Iqaluit. Although they operated as semi-satellites with their own associated rebroadcasters, they were licensed as rebroadcasters of CFYK. However, most viewers in the Arctic did not lose access to CBC programming because of the extremely high penetration of cable and satellite.

CBC North is essentially a television system within the larger CBC Television network, airing the same programming as the main network, with some exceptions. Until 2011, the CBC North stations were not licensed as television stations, but as transmitters used to redistribute CBC North's satellite feed.

The station airs a half-hour evening news program known as CBC News: Northbeat, which replaced the weekly Focus North in 1995, and is anchored by Juanita Taylor (2008–2018 by Randy Henderson). It is the only local newscast that was not merged into Canada Now from 2000 to 2006.

Another daily newscast in Inuktitut, Igalaaq ("Window", replacing the weekly Aqsarniit in 1995), is aired at 6:00 p.m. Eastern Time, again at 7:30 p.m. Eastern Time in Nunavut, and at 4:00 and 5:30 p.m. in the Northwest Territories with anchor Madeleine Allakariallak. Allakariallak took over from host Rassi Nashalik after she retired in 2014. A weekly Cree newsmagazine, Maamuitaau ("Let's get together", starting 1982), also airs on CBC North TV. These programs also aired on APTN before that channel launched its own news operation.

Unlike the other owned-and-operated CBC stations, CBC North airs few local ads, instead airing additional promotions for other CBC programs and public service announcements.

There are two CBC North television feeds: one for the Northwest Territories and Nunavut on a Mountain Time schedule, and another for Yukon on Pacific Time. All local CBC North programs originate from Yellowknife and other Arctic locales. Viewers with C-Band dishes used to be able to receive CBC North until around 2000, when the CBC switched to a proprietary digital system that would require a $3,000 receiver.

Before the change to digital transmission, the two CBC North TV satellite feeds originated in St. John's (which was seen in the Eastern Arctic) and Vancouver (which was seen in the Northwest Territories and Yukon). Those channels carried regional programs originating in those areas to the north. With the new digital transmission system (now centralized at CBC Television's headquarters in Toronto), the north no longer sees the regional east-coast and west-coast programs. Prior to this centralization, the CBC North feed also doubled as the main network feed for CBC Television's owned-and-operated stations and affiliates, with local commercials, news programs, and, in some cases, syndicated programming and other local shows replacing CBC North programming and material.

Some United States communities can receive CBC North on cable or low-powered TV.

Recordings 
The CBC Northern Service was a significant source of musical recordings of Inuit and First Nations artists in the 1970s and 1980s. After beginning Inuktitut- and Cree-language broadcasting in northern Quebec, the service saw the need for more musical content. However, initial recordings were done on cassettes, which were of little use to many of the broadcasting stations. The Northern Service began producing vinyl 45 RPM records in 1973. The first session produced singles by Charlie Panigoniak and Mark Etak. A 1975 session recorded singles from Sugluk, from Salluit, Quebec. In the late 1970s, the Northern Service's recording budget was increased, and artists were now flown in for professional recording sessions at the CBC's Montreal offices. Over 120 recordings were made in this period by artists including Morley Loon, William Tagoona, Willie Thrasher, and Alanis Obomsawin. In the mid-1980s, production was moved to Ottawa. The final sessions recorded by the service were in 1986.

Some of these recordings were remastered by Kevin "Sipreano" Howes for the 2014 compilation album Native North America, Vol. 1.

References

External links 
 CBC North
 Radio live streams in M3U format: NU/Iqaluit, QC/Chisasibi, NT/Yellowknife, NT/Inuvik, YT/Whitehorse (cf. Neville Park)
 CBC North True North Concert Series
 LyngSat Address - CBC North TV

CBC North
North
North
Canadian television systems
Canadian radio networks
Mass media in Yukon
Mass media in the Northwest Territories
Mass media in Nunavut
Culture of the Arctic
Indigenous broadcasting in Canada
Television channels and stations established in 1973